Hell is a Hieronymus Bosch painting made after 1490. It is currently in the Gallerie dell'Accademia in Venice, Italy.

This painting is part of a series of four. The others are Ascent of the Blessed, Terrestrial Paradise and Fall of the Damned into Hell. In this panel it shows the punishment of the wicked in Hell with diverse kinds of torture laid out by demons.

References

Paintings by Hieronymus Bosch
Hell in popular culture
Paintings in Venice
Demons in art
Torture in art
Paintings in the Gallerie dell'Accademia